Joe Brown may refer to:

Arts and entertainment
Joe Brown (actor)  (1884–1965), American actor
Joe Brown (judge) (born 1947), television judge and former Tennessee state criminal court judge
Joe Brown (singer) (born 1941), British singer
Joe David Brown (1915–1976), American novelist
Joe E. Brown (1891–1973), American actor and comedian

Sports

Baseball
Joe Brown (pitcher) (1900–1950), American Major League baseball player
Joe Brown (third baseman) (1902–?), minor league baseball player
Joe Brown (utility player) (1859–1888), 19th century baseball player
Joe L. Brown (1918–2010), Major League Baseball front office executive

Football
Joe Brown (footballer, born 1920) (1920–2004), English footballer
Joe Brown (footballer, born 1929) (1929–2014), English footballer and manager
Joe Brown (footballer, born 1988), English footballer

Other sports
Joe Brown (climber) (1930–2020), English mountaineer
Joe Brown (boxer) (1926–1997), American boxer
Joe Brown (rugby league) (born 1999), English rugby league footballer for Bradford Bulls
Joe Brown (sculptor) (1909–1985), American boxer, coach (Princeton University), sculptor and sculpture instructor
Joe Brown (American football), American football defensive tackle

Other people
Joe Ellis Brown (1933–2018), member of the South Carolina House of Representatives, 1986–2006
Joseph E. Brown (1821–1894), governor of the U.S. state of Georgia, 1853–1865
Joe Brown (impresario), New Zealand entrepreneur and entertainment promoter

See also
Joe Browne, American football executive
Joseph Brown (disambiguation)